Kalvano Xenito King (born 10 January 1989 in Grahamstown) is a South African rugby union player currently playing for Eastern Province Grand Challenge club side Despatch. His regular position is scrum-half.

Career

Youth and club rugby

King represented Eastern Province at several youth tournaments – he played for them at the Under-16 Grant Khomo Week in 2005, the Under-18 Academy Week in 2006 and the Under-18 Craven Week in 2007 – the latter culminating in a call-up to the S.A. Schools side.

He played for their Under-19 side during the 2007 and 2008 Under-19 Provincial Championship competitions and for the Under-21 side during the 2008 and 2009 Under-21 Provincial Championship competitions. He was offered a junior contract with Eastern Province for 2010 and included in the squad for the 2010 Vodacom Cup competition, but suffered a serious wrist injury and failed to make the breakthrough to the senior side.

He dropped down to playing club rugby, where he helped Uitenhage-based side Progress reach the final of the 2012 Super 12 series and being included in an Eastern Province Country Districts team.

Eastern Province Kings

Prior to the 2014 season, Eastern Province announced that club players would join their pre-season training squad and King was one of the players selected.

However, that turned out to be his only first class appearance, as he was not named in the Eastern Province Kings squad for the 2014 Currie Cup Premier Division.

References

South African rugby union players
Living people
1989 births
People from Makhanda, Eastern Cape
Eastern Province Elephants players
Rugby union scrum-halves
Rugby union players from the Eastern Cape